Aravane Rezaï (Arghavān-e Rezāyi , born 14 March 1987) is an Iranian–French former professional tennis player. She has defeated many top players on the WTA Tour, such as Justine Henin, Venus Williams, Victoria Azarenka, Maria Sharapova, Dinara Safina, Francesca Schiavone, Caroline Wozniacki, Marion Bartoli, Flavia Pennetta, Jelena Janković and Ai Sugiyama. Her career-high ranking was No. 15, achieved on 11 October 2010.

Personal life
Rezaï was born to Iranian parents in Saint-Étienne. She took up tennis after a childhood stint as her older brother's ball girl.

Career

2001–2008
Rezaï competed for Iran at the Women's Islamic Games, winning gold in 2001 and 2005. She also won the Chambon-sur-Lignon Open in 2004.

Rezaï started playing for France in 2006. For the second year in a row, she lost in the qualifying rounds of the Australian Open. However, her French Open run was more successful. She struggled through to the third round of the tournament, defeating Ai Sugiyama of Japan along the way. She fell to Nicole Vaidišová, in a hard-fought three-setter. Her Wimbledon dreams were also put on hold as she fell in the first round of qualifying. At the US Open, she reached the fourth round, her career best Grand Slam singles result. She also competed on the ITF Circuit throughout the year, reaching the final of two tournaments, as well as winning one in the later part of the year on the hard courts of France.

Her 2007-year started poorly, reaching the second round only twice in her first thirteen tournaments on tour, including a first-round loss at the Australian Open. At the International clay tournament of Istanbul, Rezaï reached the final by beating world No. 29 Venus Williams in the second round (6–4, 6–4) and world No. 2 Maria Sharapova in the semifinal (6–2, 6–4). In the final she lost to Elena Dementieva due to retiring, trailing 6–7, 0–3.

In spite of her good performance in the İstanbul, she lost the week after 6–2, 6–4 to countrywoman Marion Bartoli in the first round of the French Open. In her first appearance in Wimbledon she defeated Shenay Perry from the U.S. 6–2, 7–6, and Francesca Schiavone, the 29th seed, in the second round, 6–4, 2–6, 6–4. However, in the third round she was defeated by Ana Ivanovic 6–3, 6–2. At the US Open in the second round, she once again lost to Ivanovic. She ended an appalling year with yet another ITF title in Deauville, France, losing only one set en route to her victory.

Rezaï reached the final of the ASB Classic in Auckland despite being unseeded. She lost to Lindsay Davenport 2–6, 2–6. Her year stagnated with early losses in the first and second rounds of tournaments, however, and her only other grand success of the year came on the clay of Morocco in mid-spring, where she reached the semifinals before falling to Gisela Dulko.

At the Australian Open, Rezaï reached the third round, beating 13th seed Tatiana Golovin in the second round 6–3, 3–6, 6–3 before losing to Hsieh Su-wei 2–6, 7–6, 4–6. Her Grand Slam results for the rest of the year were disappointing. At the French Open, she fell to Nadia Petrova in the first round. At Wimbledon, she faced Gisela Dulko. She pushed Dulko to three sets, but eventually fell 6–1, 0–6, 2–6. The US Open started well as she defeated American Asia Muhammad 6–2, 6–4. However, she fell in the second round to Sybille Bammer, 1–6, 5–7.

2009
Rezaï won the first WTA title of her career in Strasbourg, beating Lucie Hradecká 7–6, 6–1 in the final. Despite a first-round loss at the Australian Open, she flew to the fourth round of the French Open after defeating Michelle Larcher de Brito 7–6, 6–2, but lost to world No. 1 Dinara Safina 1–6, 0–6, effectively putting an end to her participation in Roland-Garros. At Wimbledon, she beat Ayumi Morita 6–2, 6–2 but then lost to fourth seed Elena Dementieva 1–6, 3–6.

In the first round of Rogers Cup, she defeated Alizé Cornet 6–4, 7–5. In the second round, she made the biggest upset of the tournament by defeating world No. 1, Dinara Safina, 3–6, 6–2, 6–4. In the third round, she was defeated by Alisa Kleybanova in two sets 6–3, 6–4. Rezaï then lost at the US Open to Sabine Lisicki in the first round, her earliest loss ever at Flushing Meadows.
At the Toray Pan Pacific Open in Tokyo, Rezaï won her opening match in straight sets, defeating Sara Errani 6–2, 6–2. In the second round she lost to Marion Bartoli 4–6, 2–6.

Seeded tenth at the Commonwealth Bank Tournament of Champions, Rezaï won her first round-robin match against fourth seed Sabine Lisicki 6–1, 3–6, 4–6, then beat Melinda Czink in her second match 6–3, 7–5 to make her the first player to advance to the semifinals of the inaugural event. She then went on to the semifinals, where she beat María José Martínez Sánchez 6–2, 6–3. In the final she faced Marion Bartoli and won the first set 7–5 before Bartoli retired. Because of her performance Rezaï reached a new career high of world No. 26.

2010

Her first tournament of the year was the Auckland Open, where she was seeded No. 7. In the first round she beat fellow countrywoman Julie Coin 6–4, 6–3. At match point the lights in the stadium went out, but they were fixed shortly after and Rezaï closed out the match. In the second round she was defeated by Dominika Cibulková 6–3, 6–4.

Her next tournament was the Sydney International. Rezaï won her first-round match against Anna-Lena Grönefeld 6–7, 6–2, 6–2, then faced Ágnes Szávay, whom she defeated 6–3, 7–6. In the quarterfinals she beat Flavia Pennetta 6–3, 6–0; in the semifinal she faced world No. 1, Serena Williams. She began strong, leading in the match by 6–3, 5–2, and was two points away from victory, but ended up losing 6–3, 5–7, 4–6.

Rezaï was seeded No. 26 for the Australian Open. She won her first-round match against Sania Mirza 6–4, 6–2, but was then defeated in the second round by Angelique Kerber 6–2, 6–3. In the doubles draw she partnered with Sabine Lisicki, but they lost in the first round.

Her next tournament was the Open GdF Suez where she was seeded No. 5. She won her first round match against qualifier Evgeniya Rodina, 6–4, 6–4. In the second round she faced Andrea Petkovic, getting upset 6–3, 3–6, 6–3 and spoiling her chance to play Elena Dementieva in the quarterfinals. She lost in the next round.

At the Mutua Madrileña Madrid Open, Rezaï caused a huge upset in the first round, defeating the former world No. 1 and four-time French Open champion Justine Henin 4–6, 7–5, 6–0. In the second round, she won her match against Klára Zakopalová 6–3, 7–5, then defeated Andrea Petkovic in two sets 6–4, 7–6. Rezaï pulled off a major fourth-round upset by defeating Jelena Janković in two straight sets 7–5, 6–4. In the semifinal she won against Lucie Šafářová (6–1, ret.) reaching the most important final in her career. She defeated Venus Williams in the final 6–2, 7–5, coming back from a 2–5 deficit and overcoming numerous set points to win. She then to the French Open with improved odds. Because of her performance at Mutua Madrileña, Rezaï reached a new high career ranking as No. 16. Seeded 15th at the French Open, Rezaï fell to No. 19 Nadia Petrova in the third round in three sets.

On grass Rezaï played at the Birmingham Classic, cruising through the semifinals without dropping a set, but fell to eventual champion Li Na 1–6, 6–3, 3–6. She then played at the Eastbourne International, where she upset top seed Caroline Wozniacki 6–4, 1–6, 6–3 in the first round before retiring against María José Martínez Sánchez in the second round, down 6–2, 3–0. At the Wimbledon Championships, as the 18th seed, she was upset by Klára Zakopalová 5–7, 6–3, 6–3 in the second round.

At the Swedish Open Rezaï cruised through the finals with wins over Arantxa Parra Santonja and Lucie Šafářová, finally facing Gisela Dulko. Rezaï won 6–3, 4–6, 6–4, despite giving up a 4–0 lead in the third set.

At the Cincinnati Open, Rezaï was upset by world No. 98 Bojana Jovanovski 4–6, 6–3, 6–4; even though she had "breathtaking" strokes, her serve was erratic with a high number of unforced errors.

Her disappointing level of play continued right up until the end of her season, as she lost in the first round of the Tournament of Champions. She won the title in 2009 but lost to Alisa Kleybanova in the first round 1–6, 2–6.

2011

Rezaï obtained an invite from the Hong Kong Tennis Patrons' Association to play in the Hong Kong Tennis Classic with Caroline Wozniacki and Stefan Edberg for Team Europe, but they lost to Team Russia (including Vera Zvonareva, Maria Kirilenko and Yevgeny Kafelnikov) in the final of Gold Group.

She started off the year with a win over world No. 8 Jelena Janković 7–5, 2–6, 6–3 but lost in the second round to Bojana Jovanovski 6–7, 6–7.

Seeded 17th, Rezaï competed at the Australian Open. She lost in the first round to Barbora Záhlavová-Strýcová of the Czech Republic 0–6, 6–3, 5–7.

Rezaï lost in the first round of the Monterrey Open to Alla Kudryavtseva 2–6, 1–6.
At the Indian Wells Open, she reached the third round before being defeated by Maria Sharapova in straight sets, losing 2–6, 2–6.

She lost in the first round of the Sony Ericsson Open in Miami to Peng Shuai 0–6, 4–6.

Her poor form continued onto the start of the clay-court season. She lost in the first round of the Andalucia Tennis Experience in Marbella to world No. 258 Estrella Cabeza Candela 3–6, 0–6.

She returned to form at Dallas WTA tournament, where she reached the final.

2012–2014
Rezaï started her year playing in Auckland, where she lost in the first round to Peng Shuai. In Sydney, she was forced to retire in the qualifying draw. She would also go on to falling in round one of the Australian Open. She would then go on to losing in the qualifying of both Indian Wells and Miami, and fall in round two in Clearwater.
 
At the French Open, Rezaï she lost in the first round to Romanian Irina-Camelia Begu three sets (5–7, 7–5, 2–6). She reached two ITF finals this year with a victory in final at the Open 88 tournament in Contrexéville. Against Austrian Yvonne Meusburger, she won in three sets (6–3, 2–6, 6–3).

Rezaï lost in the first round of the French Open to Petra Kvitová, 3–6, 6–4, 2–6, and also in the first qualifying round of the Wimbledon to Mariana Duque Mariño, 6–4, 3–6, 3–6.

She lost in the first qualifying round of the Australian Open to Alla Kudryavtseva 4–6, 2–6.

2015–present: return to professional tennis
Rezaï announced her return to professional tennis after more than one-year absence, by taking a wildcard into the qualifying draw of the French Open, losing to compatriot Julie Coin in the first round. Later that year, she played only two tournaments in Europe, losing in the early rounds in both.

Rezaï did not play a tournament again until 2017, when she played a total of three ITF tournaments in France, but won only one match across the three, against Maria Novikova. She played one tournament each in November 2018 (in Luxembourg) and in July 2019 (in France), again falling in the early rounds of each.

Playing style
Aravane Rezaï is well known for her hard hitting games and hits the ball with immense power; players often cite her as finishing the point a lot quicker. Jelena Janković stated after her quarterfinal against Rezaï in Madrid. "Aravane hits every ball hard, no matter if it is a high or low ball you don't know where she is going to hit it. I have played players who hits the ball hard but not like Aravane. Even if I hit the ball high she is so aggressive." Venus Williams also said "Wow, what can I say? Aravane is a very hard hitter; obviously she was brought up playing on clay courts but I can not get over how hard she hits that tennis ball. She is a player to watch out for in the future. I do have warnings to other top players: watch out for her."

Political support
Rezaï told the Islamic Republic of Iran Broadcasting that she supported Iranian President Mahmoud Ahmadinejad. When the reporter asked her "Do you like Mr. Ahmadinejad?" and "why?", she responded that "Yes, I do a lot. Because he has shown Iran's power to the whole world and I am really proud of him."

In this interview, she also affirmed having presented two of her tennis rackets as a gift to Ahmadinejad. The footage of Rezaï presenting her tennis rackets to Ahmadinejad was used in his official campaign advertisement video during his 2009 presidential election campaign.

Father's controversies
Rezaï's father, Arsalan Rezaï, who was a member of her coaching team, has repeatedly been the focus of controversial allegations of violence and abuse. In one interview, Aravane said, "I had really difficult moments, lots of sacrifices. I remember playing outside in the rain and snow." Her father mentioned the concern neighbours had about his training methods: "I had lots of problems to train this girl: lack of money and lack of courts. There were neighbours who bothered us. They accused me, saying that this man was killing this child. But today she's not dead. She's happy."

At one point, the French Tennis Federation was forced to employ bodyguards to prevent Arsalan from attacking other competitors' fathers. In one 2006 incident, Arsalan attacked Sergey Vesnin, the father of Elena Vesnina, and then accidentally hit his own daughter with a racquet. Aravane was denied training funds that are typically available to all French players, and she was also banned in 2007 from training with other players at Roland Garros because of her father's dispute with the French Fed Cup captain.

Just prior to her loss in the first round of the 2011 Australian Open, Arsalan was violent to his daughter and threatened her boyfriend. After losing the match, Aravane said, "I do not want to look for excuses but I had a lot of trouble on the morning of the match." The WTA banned Arsalan from the tour indefinitely, pending investigation. The incident was also investigated by the Victoria police.

Performance timelines
Only main-draw results in WTA Tour, Grand Slam tournaments, Fed Cup and Olympic Games are included in win–loss records.

Singles

Doubles

Significant finals

WTA Elite Trophy

Singles: 1 (1 title)

WTA 1000 tournaments

Singles: 1 (1 title)

WTA career finals

Singles: 7 (4 titles, 3 runner-ups)

ITF finals

Singles: 12 (8 titles, 4 runner-ups)

Top 10 wins

See also
 Muslim women in sport

Notes

References

External links

 
 

1987 births
Living people
Sportspeople from Saint-Étienne
People from Neuchâtel
French female tennis players
French expatriate sportspeople in Switzerland
French people of Iranian descent
Iranian female tennis players